The Aboriginal Tasmanians (Palawa kani: Palawa or Pakana) are the Aboriginal people of the Australian island of Tasmania, located south of the mainland. For much of the 20th century, the Tasmanian Aboriginal people were widely, and erroneously, thought of as being an extinct cultural and ethnic group that had been intentionally exterminated by white settlers. Contemporary figures (2016) for the number of people of Tasmanian Aboriginal descent vary according to the criteria used to determine this identity, ranging from 6,000 to over 23,000.

First arriving in Tasmania (then a peninsula of Australia) around 40,000 years ago, the ancestors of the Aboriginal Tasmanians were cut off from the Australian mainland by rising sea levels c. 6000 BC. They were entirely isolated from the outside world for 8,000 years until European contact.

Before British colonisation of Tasmania in 1803, there were an estimated 3,000–15,000 Palawa. The Palawa population suffered a drastic drop in numbers within three decades, so that by 1835 only some 400 full-blooded Tasmanian Aboriginal people survived, most of this remnant being incarcerated in camps where all but 47 died within the following 12 years. No consensus exists as to the cause, over which a major controversy arose. The traditional view, still affirmed, held that this dramatic demographic collapse was the result of the impact of introduced diseases, rather than the consequence of policy. Geoffrey Blainey, for example, wrote that by 1830 in Tasmania: "Disease had killed most of them but warfare and private violence had also been devastating." Henry Reynolds attributed the depletion to losses in the Black War. Keith Windschuttle claimed that in addition to disease, the prostitution of women in a society already in decline, explained the extinction. Many historians of colonialism and genocide, such as Ben Kiernan, Colin Tatz, and Benjamin Madley, consider that the Tasmanian decimation qualifies as genocide by the definition of Raphael Lemkin adopted in the UN Genocide Convention.

By 1833, George Augustus Robinson, sponsored by Lieutenant-Governor George Arthur, had persuaded the approximately 200 surviving Aboriginal Tasmanians to surrender themselves with assurances that they would be protected and provided for, and eventually have their lands returned. These assurances were no more than a ruse by Robinson or Lieutenant-Governor Arthur to transport the Tasmanians quietly to a permanent exile in the Furneaux Islands. The survivors were moved to Wybalenna Aboriginal Establishment on Flinders Island, where disease continued to reduce their numbers. In 1847, the last 47 survivors on Wybalenna were transferred to Oyster Cove, south of Hobart. Two individuals, Truganini (1812–1876) and Fanny Cochrane Smith (1834–1905), are separately considered to have been the last people solely of Tasmanian descent.

The complete Aboriginal Tasmanian languages have been lost; research suggests that the languages spoken on the island belonged to several distinct language families. Some original Tasmanian language words remained in use with Palawa people in the Furneaux Islands, and there are some efforts to reconstruct a language from the available wordlists. Today, some thousands of people living in Tasmania describe themselves as Aboriginal Tasmanians, since a number of Palawa women bore children to European men in the Furneaux Islands and mainland Tasmania.

History

Before European settlement

People crossed into Tasmania approximately 40,000 years ago via a land bridge between the island and the rest of mainland Australia, during the Last Glacial Period. Genetic studies show that once the sea level rose to flood the Bassian Plain, the island's population was isolated for approximately 8,000 years, until European exploration in the late 18th and early 19th centuries.

Until the 1980s, it was thought that Tasmania was only occupied relatively recently, but the discovery of 19,000-year-old deposits at Kutikina (or Fraser) Cave demonstrated the Ice Age occupation of the highlands. In 1990, archaeologists excavated material in the Warreen Cave in the Maxwell River valley of the south-west, proving Aboriginal occupation from as early as 34,000 BP, making Aboriginal Tasmanians the southernmost population in the world during the Pleistocene era. Digs in southwest and central Tasmania turned up abundant finds, affording "the richest archaeological evidence from Pleistocene Greater Australia" from 35,000 to 11,000 BP.

Migration chronology 
Tasmania was colonised by successive waves of Aboriginal people from southern Australia during glacial maxima, when the sea was at its lowest. The archeological and geographic record suggests a period of drying during the colder glacial period, with a desert extending from southern Australia into the midlands of Tasmania, with intermittent periods of wetter, warmer climate. Migrants from southern Australia into peninsular Tasmania would have crossed stretches of seawater and desert, and finally found oases in the King highlands (now King Island).

The archeological, geographic and linguistic record suggests successive waves of occupation of Tasmania, and coalescence of three language groups into one broad group. Colonial settlers found two main language and ethnic groups in Tasmania upon their arrival, the western Nara and eastern Mara. The admixture of Nara toponyms (place-names) in the Eastern territory of the Mara languages seem to be a relic of ancient conquests mirroring the hostilities during colonial times.

 Pleistocene Palawa language group – the first ethnic and language group in Tasmania; absorbed or displaced by successive invasions except for remnant group on Tasman peninsula. Absorbed population in Eastern Tasmania combined with Victorian speakers to form Mara language group across broader eastern Tasmania
 Furneaux speakers displace Palawa in north-east Tasmania as far south as Orford. Themselves disappear or are absorbed into the Mara language group, a composite of Pleistocene Palawa, Furneaux, and Victorian
 Nara speakers invade, but are pushed back to Western Tasmania. Correlates with Western nation of Tasmanian Aboriginal people.

After the sea rose to create Bass Strait, the Australian mainland and Tasmania became separate land masses, and the Aboriginal people who had migrated from mainland Australia became cut off from their cousins on the mainland. Archeological evidence suggests remnant populations on the King and Furneaux highlands were stranded by the rising waters – later to die out.

Early European contact
Abel Jansen Tasman, credited as the first European to discover Tasmania (in 1642) and who named it Van Diemen's Land, did not encounter any of the Aboriginal Tasmanians when he landed.
In 1772, a French exploratory expedition under Marion Dufresne visited Tasmania. At first, contact with the Aboriginal people was friendly; however the Aboriginal Tasmanians became alarmed when another boat was dispatched towards the shore. It was reported that spears and stones were thrown and the French responded with musket fire, killing at least one Aboriginal person and wounding several others. Two later French expeditions led by Bruni d'Entrecasteaux in 1792–93 and Nicolas Baudin in 1802 made friendly contact with the Aboriginal Tasmanians; the d'Entrecasteaux expedition doing so over an extended period of time.

The Resolution under Captain Tobias Furneaux (part of an expedition led by Captain James Cook) had visited in 1773 but made no contact with the Aboriginal Tasmanians although gifts were left for them in unoccupied shelters found on Bruny Island. The first known British contact with the Aboriginal Tasmanians was on Bruny Island by Captain Cook in 1777. The contact was peaceful. Captain William Bligh also visited Bruny Island in 1788 and made peaceful contact with the Aboriginal Tasmanians.

Contact with sealers, and the formation of the Bass Strait community
More extensive contact between Aboriginal Tasmanians and Europeans resulted when British and American seal hunters began visiting the islands in Bass Strait as well as the northern and eastern coasts of Tasmania from the late 1790s. Shortly thereafter (by about 1800), sealers were regularly left on uninhabited islands in Bass Strait during the sealing season (November to May). The sealers established semi-permanent camps or settlements on the islands, which were close enough for the sealers to reach the main island of Tasmania in small boats and so make contact with the Aboriginal Tasmanians.

Trading relationships developed between sealers and Tasmanian Aboriginal tribes. Hunting dogs became highly prized by the Aboriginal people, as were other exotic items such as flour, tea and tobacco. The Aboriginal people traded kangaroo skins for such goods. However, a trade in Aboriginal women soon developed. Many Tasmanian Aboriginal women were highly skilled in hunting seals, as well as in obtaining other foods such as seabirds, and some Tasmanian tribes would trade their services and, more rarely, those of Aboriginal men to the sealers for the seal-hunting season. Others were sold on a permanent basis. This trade incorporated not only women of the tribe engaged in the trade but also women abducted from other tribes. Some may have been given to incorporate the new arrivals into Aboriginal society through marriage.

Sealers engaged in raids along the coasts to abduct Aboriginal women and were reported to have killed Aboriginal men in the process. By 1810 seal numbers had been greatly reduced by hunting so most seal hunters abandoned the area, however a small number of sealers, approximately fifty mostly "renegade sailors, escaped convicts or ex-convicts", remained as permanent residents of the Bass Strait islands and some established families with Tasmanian Aboriginal women.

Some of the women were taken back to the islands by the sealers involuntarily and some went willingly, as in the case of a woman called Tarenorerer (Eng: Walyer). Differing opinions have been given on Walyer's involvement with the sealers. McFarlane writes that she voluntarily joined the sealers with members of her family, and was responsible for attacking Aboriginal people and white settlers alike. Ryan comes to a different conclusion, that Walyer had been abducted at Port Sorell by Aboriginal people and traded to the sealers for dogs and flour. Walyer was later to gain some notoriety for her attempts to kill the sealers to escape their brutality. Walyer, a Punnilerpanner, joined the Plairhekehillerplue band after eventually escaping and went on to lead attacks on employees of the Van Diemen's Land Company. Walyer's attacks are the first recorded use of muskets by Aboriginal people. Captured, she refused to work and was banished to Penguin Island. Later imprisoned on Swan Island she attempted to organise a rebellion. Although Aboriginal women were by custom forbidden to take part in war, several Aboriginal women who escaped from sealers became leaders or took part in attacks. According to Lyndall Ryan, the women traded to or kidnapped by sealers became "a significant dissident group" against European/white authority.

Historian James Bonwick reported Aboriginal women who were clearly captives of sealers but he also reported women living with sealers who "proved faithful and affectionate to their new husbands", women who appeared "content" and others who were allowed to visit their "native tribe", taking gifts, with the sealers being confident that they would return. Bonwick also reports a number of claims of brutality by sealers towards Aboriginal women including some of those made by Robinson. An Aboriginal woman by the name of Bulrer related her experience to Robinson, that sealers had rushed her camp and stolen six women including herself "the white men tie them and then they flog them very much, plenty much blood, plenty cry." Sealing captain James Kelly wrote in 1816 that the custom of the sealers was to each have "two to five of these native women for their own use and benefit". A shortage of women available "in trade" resulted in abduction becoming common, and in 1830 it was reported that at least fifty Aboriginal women were "kept in slavery" on the Bass Strait islands.

There are numerous stories of the sealers' brutality towards the Aboriginal women; with some of these reports originating from Robinson. In 1830, Robinson seized 14 Aboriginal women from the sealers, planning for them to marry Aboriginal men at the Flinders Island settlement. Josephine Flood, an archaeologist specialising in Australian mainland Aboriginal peoples, notes: "he encountered strong resistance from the women as well as sealers". The sealers sent a representative, James Munro, to appeal to Governor George Arthur and argue for the women's return, on the basis that they wanted to stay with their sealer husbands and children rather than marry Aboriginal men unknown to them. Arthur ordered the return of some of the women. Shortly thereafter, Robinson began to disseminate stories, told to him by James Munro, of atrocities allegedly committed by the sealers against Aboriginal people, and against Aboriginal women in particular. Brian Plomley, who edited Robinson's papers, expressed scepticism about these atrocities and notes that they were not reported to Archdeacon William Broughton's 1830 committee of inquiry into violence towards Tasmanians. Abduction and ill-treatment of Aboriginal Tasmanians certainly occurred, but the extent is debated.

The raids for and trade in Aboriginal women contributed to the rapid depletion of the numbers of Aboriginal women in the northern areas of Tasmania – "by 1830 only three women survived in northeast Tasmania among 72 men" – and thus contributed in a significant manner to the demise of the full-blooded Aboriginal population of Tasmania. However, a mixed-race community of partial Tasmanian Aboriginal descent formed on the Islands, where it remains to the present, and many modern day Aboriginal Tasmanians trace their descent from the 19th century sealer communities of Bass Strait.

After European settlement

Between 1803 and 1823, there were two phases of conflict between the Aboriginal people and the British colonists. The first took place between 1803 and 1808 over the need for common food sources such as oysters and kangaroos, and the second between 1808 and 1823, when only a small number of white females lived among the colonists, and farmers, sealers and whalers took part in the trading, and the abduction, of Aboriginal women as sexual partners. These practices also increased conflict over women among Aboriginal tribes. This in turn led to a decline in the Aboriginal population. Historian Lyndall Ryan records 74 Aboriginal people (almost all women) living with sealers on the Bass Strait islands in the period up to 1835.

By 1816, kidnapping of Aboriginal children for labour had become widespread. In 1814, Governor Thomas Davey issued a proclamation expressing "utter indignation and abhorrence" in regards to the kidnapping of the children and in 1819 Governor William Sorell not only re-issued the proclamation but ordered that those who had been taken without parental consent were to be sent to Hobart and supported at government expense.
A number of young Aboriginal children were known to be living with settlers. An Irish sealer named Brien spared the life of the baby son of a native woman he had abducted, explaining, "as (he) had stolen the dam he would keep the cub." When the child grew up he became an invaluable assistant to Brien but was considered "no good" by his own people as he was brought up to dislike Aboriginal people, whom he considered "dirty lazy brutes." Twenty-six were definitely known (through baptismal records) to have been taken into settlers' homes as infants or very small children, too young to be of service as labourers. Some Aboriginal children were sent to the Orphan School in Hobart. Lyndall Ryan reports fifty-eight Aboriginal people, of various ages, living with settlers in Tasmania in the period up to 1835.

Some historians argue that European disease did not appear to be a serious factor until after 1829. Other historians including Geoffrey Blainey and Keith Windschuttle, point to introduced disease as the main cause of the destruction of the full-blooded Tasmanian Aboriginal population. Keith Windschuttle argues that while smallpox never reached Tasmania, respiratory diseases such as influenza, pneumonia and tuberculosis and the effects of venereal diseases devastated the Tasmanian Aboriginal population whose long isolation from contact with the mainland compromised their resistance to introduced disease. The work of historian James Bonwick and anthropologist H. Ling Roth, both writing in the 19th century, also point to the significant role of epidemics and infertility without clear attribution of the sources of the diseases as having been introduced through contact with Europeans. Bonwick, however, did note that Tasmanian Aboriginal women were infected with venereal diseases by Europeans. Introduced venereal disease not only directly caused deaths but, more insidiously, left a significant percentage of the population unable to reproduce. Josephine Flood, archaeologist, wrote: "Venereal disease sterilised and chest complaints – influenza, pneumonia and tuberculosis – killed."

Bonwick, who lived in Tasmania, recorded a number of reports of the devastating effect of introduced disease including one report by a Doctor Story, a Quaker, who wrote: "After 1823 the women along with the tribe seemed to have had no children; but why I do not know.". Later historians have reported that introduced venereal disease caused infertility amongst the Aboriginal Tasmanians. Bonwick also recorded a strong Aboriginal oral tradition of an epidemic even before formal colonisation in 1803. "Mr Robert Clark, in a letter to me, said: 'I have gleaned from some of the Aborigines, now in their graves, that they were more numerous than the white people were aware of, but their numbers were very much thinned by a sudden attack of disease which was general among the entire population previous to the arrival of the English, entire tribes of natives having been swept off in the course of one or two days' illness.'" Such an epidemic may be linked to contact with sailors or sealers.

Henry Ling Roth, an anthropologist, wrote: "Calder, who has gone more fully into the particulars of their illnesses, writes as follows ...: 'Their rapid declension after the colony was founded is traceable, as far as our proofs allow us to judge, to the prevalence of epidemic disorders....'" Roth was referring to James Erskine Calder who took up a post as a surveyor in Tasmania in 1829 and who wrote a number of scholarly papers about the Aboriginal people. "According to Calder, a rapid and remarkable declension of the numbers of the Aborigines had been going on long before the remnants were gathered together on Flinders Island. Whole tribes (some of which Robinson mentions by name as being in existence fifteen or twenty years before he went amongst them, and which probably never had a shot fired at them) had absolutely and entirely vanished. To the causes to which he attributes this strange wasting away ... I think infecundity, produced by the infidelity of the women to their husbands in the early times of the colony, may be safely added ... Robinson always enumerates the sexes of the individuals he took; ... and as a general thing, found scarcely any children amongst them; ... adultness was found to outweigh infancy everywhere in a remarkable degree ..."

Robinson recorded in his journals a number of comments regarding the Aboriginal Tasmanians' susceptibility to diseases, particularly respiratory diseases. In 1832 he revisited the west coast of Tasmania, far from the settled regions, and wrote: "The numbers of Aborigines along the western coast have been considerably reduced since the time of my last visit [1830]. A mortality has raged amongst them which together with the severity of the season and other causes had rendered the paucity of their number very considerable."

Between 1825 and 1831 a pattern of guerilla warfare by the Aboriginal Tasmanians was identified by the colonists. Rapid pastoral expansion, a depletion of native game and an increase in the colony's population triggered Aboriginal resistance from 1824 onwards when it has been estimated by Lyndall Ryan that 1000 Aboriginal people remained in the settled districts. Whereas settlers and stock keepers had previously provided rations to the Aboriginal people during their seasonal movements across the settled districts, and recognised this practice as some form of payment for trespass and loss of traditional hunting grounds, the new settlers and stock keepers were unwilling to maintain these arrangements and the Aboriginal people began to raid settlers' huts for food.

The official Government position was that Aboriginal people were blameless for any hostilities, but when Musquito was hanged in 1825, a significant debate was generated which split the colonists along class lines. The "higher grade" saw the hanging as a dangerous precedent and argued that Aboriginal people were only defending their land and should not be punished for doing so. The "lower grade" of colonists wanted more Aboriginal people hanged to encourage a "conciliatory line of conduct." Governor Arthur sided with the "lower grade" and 1825 saw the first official acceptance that Aboriginal people were at least partly to blame for conflict.

In 1826 the Government gazette, which had formerly reported "retaliatory actions" by Aboriginal people, now reported "acts of atrocity" and for the first time used the terminology "Aborigine" instead of "native". A newspaper reported that there were only two solutions to the problem: either they should be "hunted down like wild beasts and destroyed" or they should be removed from the settled districts. The colonial Government assigned troops to drive them out. A Royal Proclamation in 1828 established military posts on the boundaries and a further proclamation declared martial law against the Aboriginal people. As it was recognised that there were fixed routes for seasonal migration, Aboriginal people were required to have passes if they needed to cross the settled districts with bounties offered for the capture of those without passes, £5 (around 2010:$1,000) for an adult and £2 for children, a process that often led to organised hunts resulting in deaths. Every dispatch from Governor Arthur to the Secretary of State during this period stressed that in every case where Aboriginal people had been killed it was colonists that initiated hostilities.

Though many Aboriginal deaths went unrecorded, the Cape Grim massacre in 1828 demonstrates the level of frontier violence towards Aboriginal Tasmanians.

The Black War of 1828–32 and the Black Line of 1830 were turning points in the relationship with European settlers. Even though many of the Aboriginal people managed to avoid capture during these events, they were shaken by the size of the campaigns against them, and this brought them to a position whereby they were willing to surrender to Robinson and move to Flinders Island.

Aboriginal Tasmanians and settlers mentioned in literature 1800–1835
European and Aboriginal casualties, including the Aboriginal residents who were captured, may be considered as reasonably accurate. The figures for the Aboriginal population shot is likely a substantial undercount.

Resettlement of the Aboriginal population
In late 1831 Robinson brought the first 51 Aboriginals to a settlement on Flinders Island named The Lagoons, which turned out to be inadequate as it was exposed to gales, had little water and no land suitable for cultivation.
Supplies to the settlement were inadequate and if sealers had not supplied potatoes, the Aboriginal people would have starved. The Europeans were living on oatmeal and potatoes while the Aboriginal people, who detested oatmeal and refused to eat it, survived on potatoes and rice supplemented by mutton birds they caught. Within months 31 Aboriginal people had died. Roth wrote:

By January 1832 a further 44 captured Aboriginal residents had arrived and conflicts arose between the tribal groups. To defuse the situation, Sergeant Wight took the Big River group to Green island, where they were abandoned and he later decided to move the rest to Green Island as well. Two weeks later Robinson arrived with Lieutenant Darling, the new commander for the station, and moved the Aboriginal people back to The Lagoons. Darling ensured a supply of plentiful food and permitted "hunting excursions." In October 1832, it was decided to build a new camp with better buildings (wattle and daub) at a more suitable location, Pea Jacket Point. Pea Jacket Point was renamed Civilisation Point but became more commonly known as Wybalenna, which in the Ben Lomond language meant 'black men's houses'.

Robinson befriended Truganini, learned some of the local language and in 1833 managed to persuade the remaining 154 "full-blooded" people to move to the new settlement on Flinders Island, where he promised a modern and comfortable environment, and that they would be returned to their former homes on the Tasmanian mainland as soon as possible. At the Wybalenna Aboriginal establishment on Flinders Island, described by historian Henry Reynolds as the "best equipped and most lavishly staffed Aboriginal institution in the Australian colonies in the nineteenth century", they were provided with housing, clothing, rations of food, the services of a doctor and educational facilities. Convicts were assigned to build housing and do most of the work at the settlement including the growing of food in the vegetable gardens. After arrival, all Aboriginal children aged between six and 15 years were removed from their families to be brought up by the storekeeper and a lay preacher. The Aboriginal people were free to roam the island and were often absent from the settlement for extended periods on hunting trips as the rations supplied turned out to be inadequate. By 1835 the living conditions had deteriorated to the extent that in October Robinson personally took charge of Wybalenna, organising better food and improving the housing. However, of the 220 who arrived with Robinson, most died in the following 14 years from introduced disease and inadequate shelter. As a result of their loss of freedom, the birth rate was extremely low and few children survived infancy.

In 1839, Governor Franklin appointed a board to inquire into the conditions at Wybalenna that rejected Robinson's claims regarding improved living conditions and found the settlement to be a failure. The report was never released and the government continued to promote Wybalenna as a success in the treatment of Aboriginal people. In March 1847 six Aboriginals at Wybalenna presented a petition to Queen Victoria, the first petition to a reigning monarch from any Aboriginal group in Australia, requesting that the promises made to them be honoured. In October 1847, the 47 survivors were transferred to their final settlement at Oyster Cove station. Only 44 survived the trip (11 couples, 12 single men and 10 children) and the children were immediately sent to the orphan school in Hobart. Although the housing and food was better than Wybalenna, the station was a former convict station that had been abandoned earlier that year due to health issues as it was located on inadequately drained mudflats. According to the guards, the Aboriginal people developed "too much independence" by trying to continue their culture which they considered "recklessness" and "rank ingratitude." Their numbers continued to diminish, being estimated in 1859 at around a dozen and, by 1869, there was only one, who died in 1876.

Commenting in 1899 on Robinson's claims of success, anthropologist Henry Ling Roth wrote:

Anthropological interest 

The Oyster Cove people attracted contemporaneous international scientific interest from the 1860s onwards, with many museums claiming body parts for their collections. Scientists were interested in studying Aboriginal Tasmanians from a physical anthropology perspective, hoping to gain insights into the field of paleoanthropology. For these reasons, they were interested in individual Aboriginal body parts and whole skeletons.

Tasmanian Aboriginal skulls were particularly sought internationally for studies into craniofacial anthropometry. Truganini herself entertained fears that her body might be exploited after her death and two years after her death her body was exhumed and sent to Melbourne for scientific study. Her skeleton was then put up for public display in the Tasmanian Museum until 1947, and was only laid to rest, by cremation, in 1976. Another case was the removal of the skull and scrotum – for a tobacco pouch – of William Lanne, known as King Billy, on his death in 1869.

However, many of these skeletons were obtained from Aboriginal "mummies" from graves or bodies of the murdered. Amalie Dietrich for example became famous for delivering such specimens.

Aboriginal people have considered the dispersal of body parts as being disrespectful, as a common aspect within Aboriginal belief systems is that a soul can only be at rest when laid in its homeland.

20th century to present 

Body parts and ornaments are still being returned from collections today, with the Royal College of Surgeons of England returning samples of Truganini's skin and hair (in 2002), and the British Museum returning ashes to two descendants in 2007.

During the 20th century, the absence of Aboriginal people of solely Aboriginal ancestry, and a general unawareness of the surviving populations, meant many non-Aboriginal people assumed they were extinct, after the death of Truganini in 1876. Since the mid-1970s Tasmanian Aboriginal activists such as Michael Mansell have sought to broaden awareness and identification of Aboriginal descent.

A dispute exists within the Tasmanian Aboriginal community, however, over what constitutes Aboriginality. The Palawa, mainly descendants of white male sealers and Tasmanian Aboriginal women who settled on the Bass Strait Islands, were given the power to decide who is of Tasmanian Aboriginal descent at the state level (entitlement to government Aboriginal services). Palawa recognise only descendants of the Bass Strait Island community as Aboriginal and do not consider as Aboriginal the Lia Pootah, who claim descent, based on oral traditions, from Tasmanian mainland Aboriginal communities. The Lia Pootah feel that the Palawa controlled Tasmanian Aboriginal Centre does not represent them politically.
Since 2007 there have been initiatives to introduce DNA testing to establish family history in descendant subgroups. This is strongly opposed by the Palawa and has drawn an angry reaction from some quarters, as some have claimed "spiritual connection" with Aboriginality distinct from, but not as important as the existence of a genetic link. The Lia Pootah object to the current test used to prove Aboriginality as they believe it favours the Palawa, a DNA test would circumvent barriers to Lia Pootah recognition, or disprove their claims to Aboriginality.

In April 2000, the Tasmanian Government Legislative Council Select Committee on Aboriginal Lands discussed the difficulty of determining Aboriginality based on oral traditions. An example given by Prof. Cassandra Pybus was the claim by the Huon and Channel Aboriginal people who had an oral history of descent from two Aboriginal women. Research found that both were non-Aboriginal convict women.

The Tasmanian Palawa Aboriginal community is making an effort to reconstruct and reintroduce a Tasmanian language, called palawa kani out of the various records on Tasmanian languages. Other Tasmanian Aboriginal communities use words from traditional Tasmanian languages, according to the language area they were born or live in.

Tasmanian Aboriginal nations

The social organisation of Aboriginal Tasmanians had at least two hierarchies: the domestic unit or family group and the social unit or clan - which had a self-defining name with 40 to 50 people. It is contentious whether there was a larger political organisation, hitherto described as a "tribe" in the literature (and by colonial observers), as there is no evidence in the historical literature of larger political entities above that of the clan. Robinson, who gathered ethnographic data in the early 1800s, described Aboriginal political groups at the clan level only. Nevertheless, clans that shared a geographic region and language group are now usually classified by modern ethnographers, and the Palawa, as a nation.

Estimates made of the combined population of Aboriginal people of Tasmania, before European arrival in Tasmania, are in the range of 3,000 to 15,000 people. Genetic studies have suggested much higher figures which is supported by oral traditions that Aboriginal people were "more numerous than the white people were aware of" but that their population had been greatly reduced by a sudden outbreak of disease before 1803. It is speculated that early contacts with sealers before colonisation had resulted in an epidemic. Using archaeological evidence, Stockton (I983:68) estimated 3,000 to 6,000 for the northern half of the west coast alone, or up to six times the commonly accepted estimate, however he later revised this to 3,000 to 5,000 for the entire island, based on historical sources. The low rate of genetic drift indicates that Stockton's original maximum estimate is likely the lower boundary and, while not indicated by the archaeological record, a population as high as 100,000 can "not be rejected out of hand". This is supported by carrying capacity data indicating greater resource productivity in Tasmania than the mainland.

Aboriginal Tasmanians were primarily nomadic people who lived in adjoining territories, moving based on seasonal changes in food supplies such as seafood, land mammals and native vegetables and berries. They socialised, intermarried and fought "wars" against other clans.

According to Ryan, the population of Tasmania was aligned into nine nations composed of six to fifteen clans each, with each clan comprising two to six extended family units who were relations. Individual clans ranged over a defined nation boundary with elaborate rites of entry required of visitors.

There were more than 60 clans before European colonisation, although only 48 have been located and associated with particular territories.
The location and migratory patterns discussed below come from the work of Jones (cited in Tindale). Ryan used Jones' work in her seminal history of Aboriginal Tasmanians but Taylor discusses in his thesis how Jones' original work is uncited and possibly conjectural. Moreover, Jones published his work without recourse to Plomley's later extensive descriptions of Tasmanian Aboriginal clan groups. Given this, the clan boundaries and nomadic patterns discussed below should be taken with caution unless referenced from primary documents.

Oyster Bay (Paredarerme)
The Paredarerme was estimated to be the largest Tasmanian nation with ten clans totalling 700 to 800 people. The members of the Paredarerme nation had good relations with the Big River nation, with large congregations at favoured hunting sites inland and at the coast. Relations with the North Midlands nation were mostly hostile, and evidence suggests that the Douglas-Apsley region may have been a dangerous borderland rarely visited (Ferguson 1986 pg22). Generally, the clans of the Paredarerme ranged inland to the High Country for spring and summer and returned to the coast for autumn and winter, but not all people left their territory each year with some deciding to stay by the coast. Migrations provided a varied diet with plentiful seafood, seals and birds on the coast, and good hunting for kangaroos, wallabies and possums inland. The High Country also provided opportunities to trade for ochre with the North-west and North people, and to harvest intoxicating gum from Eucalyptus gunnii, found only on the plateau. The key determinant of camp sites was topography. The majority of camps were along river valleys, adjacent north facing hill slopes and on gentle slopes bordering a forest or marsh (Brown 1986).

North East
The North East nation consisted of seven clans totalling around 500 people. They had good relations with the Ben Lomond nation - granted seasonal access to the resources of the north-east coast.

North
The Northern nation consisted of four clans totalling 200–300 people. Their country contained the most important ochre mines in Tasmania, accessed by well defined roads kept open by firing. They traded the ochre with nearby clanspeople. They would spend part of the year in the country of the North West nation to hunt seals and collect shells from Robbins Island for necklaces. The settlement was a failure, with the inland areas described as "wet, cold and soggy", while the coastal region was difficult to clear, as Superintendent Henry Hellyer noted the "forest [was] altogether unlike anything I have seen in the Island". However, in 1827 a port was established at Emu Bay. In 1828 Tarerenorerer (Eng:Walyer), a woman who had escaped from sealers, became the leader of the Emu Bay people and attacked the settlers with stolen weapons, the first recorded use of muskets by Aboriginal people.

Big River
The Big River nation numbered 400–500 people consisting of five clans. Little is known of their seasonal movements although it is believed that four of the five clans moved through Oyster Bay territory along the Derwent River to reach their coastal camps near Pitt Water. The Oyster Bay People had reciprocal movement rights through Big River territory.

North Midlands
The North Midlands nation occupied the Midland plains, a major geographical area formed in a horst and graben valley which was also subject to previous major freshwater lacustrine inundation.
The result being a relatively flat and fertile landscape that supported a large biomass, thus being a major food source for the Aboriginal peoples.
The North Midlands nation is likely to have consisted of several clans but there are three accepted major clan divisions described in the ethnographic literature today. The total population of the North Midlands nation has been estimated to be between 300 and 500 and, although migratory, the archeological and historical record infers seasonal residency in locations adjacent to permanent water sources in the Midlands valley.

Boundaries of the North Midlands nation
The North Midlands nation was circumscribed by the geographical constraints of the Midlands valley. To the west the nation was bounded by the escarpment of the Great Western Tiers, to the north-east the boundaries are less certain; with the eastern Tamar appearing to have been occupied by the Letteremairrener as far east as Piper's River: where the Poremairrenerner clan of the North-east nation were resident.
The occupation of the western Tamar is open to dispute – the ethnographic record suggests that it was the province of the Pallitorre and Parnillerpanner clans of the North nation; or the Leterrmairrener; or a hitherto unnamed clan of the North Midlands nation. It is likely that the west Tamar valley, or the Meander river valley formed the NNW boundaries of the North Midlands nation – with the arc of highlands formed by Cluan Tier and Dry's Bluff forming the nor-western extremity of their country.
To the east the natural boundary was the South-Esk River and, running northwards, the high tier of Mts Barrow, Arthur and Tippogoree Hills: beyond which lay the North-east nation. Running south past the eastern bend of the South-Esk it appears that the North Midlands Nation held land to some extent along the south bank of the Esk, at least as far as Avoca and possibly as far as the natural boundary of the St Pauls River, beyond which the Oyster Bay nation were resident.
To the south their country was constrained by the uplands beyond Tunbridge, as the plains narrow towards Big River and Oyster Bay country.

Language of the North Midlands nation
The North Midlands language is classified as "mairremenner" and was spoken by the Ben Lomond and North-east nations and also the Luggermairrenerpairer clan of the Central Highlands. This language group is likely to be a derivation of three other Tasmanian languages.

Clans of the North Midlands nation
Three major national divisions are generally ascribed to the North Midlands nation although it is likely that more clans existed and Ryan (2012) asserts the possibility of another two clan territories. What is known of the composition of the North Midlands nation derives from settler description (who ascribed simple tribal divisions based upon locality), direct attribution from contemporary Aboriginal Tasmanians (recorded by Robinson collated by Plomley) and later research by Rhys Jones. From this we can be certain that there were three major clan divisions, described by colonials as the Port Dalrymple tribe (Leterrermairrener clan), at the Tamar River; Pennyroyal Creek tribe (Panninher), at Norfolk Plains; and the Stony Creek tribe (Tyrrernotepanner), at Campbell Town.

Letteremairrener "Port Dalrymple" clan
The Letteremairrener (Letter-ramare-ru-nah) clan occupied country from Low Head to modern day Launceston. In colonial times reports were made of clusters of huts, up to ten in number, in the Tamar valley and there are extensive archeological remains of occupation on both sides of the Tamar river and north coastal country.

Toponymy
Little is recorded of the toponymy of their country but some local placenames have survived and are likely to be of the "Nara" language group.
 Tamar River: kunermurluker, morerutter, ponrabbel
 Low Head: Pilerwaytackenter
 Georgetown area: Kennemerthertackenloongentare
 Launceston (Port Dalrymple): Taggener, Lorernulraytitteter
 North-Esk River: Lakekeller
 Mt Barrow: Pialermaligena

Significant sites
Little is known of specific sites of significance to the Letteremairrener, but contemporary Palawa assert the significance of the Cataract Gorge
as a place of ceremony and significance. Certainly, in 1847, when a surviving Aboriginal "chief" was temporarily returned to Launceston from exile in Wybalenna, he requested to be taken to the Cataract Gorge and was described as being jubilant at return to the Gorge, followed with apparent lamentation at what had been lost to him.
There are no recorded significant archeological remains in the Gorge precinct, although the area was subject to significant seasonal flooding before damming.

The Letteremairrener had been recorded to have specific meeting places at Paterson's Plains (near modern-day St Leonards) and groups as large as 150 had been recorded in colonial times in this vicinity. The clan country overlapped with that of the Panninher and Tyrrernotepanner and it is likely that, at times, the clans shared resources across clan borders.

Colonial contact
The Letteremairrener were among the first Aboriginal peoples to be affected by the impact of colonisation by the British as colonial occupation commenced at Port Dalrymple and progressed to Launceston, with settlers progressively occupying land up the Tamar valley.
By the early 1800s the Letteremairrener had been involved in skirmishes with exploratory parties of colonials, in the second decade of that century they had reached some accommodation with the interlopers; and were observed practicing spear throwing near present-day Paterson Barracks and watching colonial women wash clothes at Cataract Gorge.
Between 1811 and 1827 several Aboriginal children were baptised in Launceston, either abducted or the progeny of settler/Aboriginal liaisons. By 1830 the people of the Letteremairenner had largely disappeared from their homeland and the survivors were waging a desperate guerrilla war with colonial British, living a fringe existence in Launceston or living life on the margin at the peripheries of their traditional land.
By 1837 the Letteremairrenner had disappeared completely from the Tamar Valley and would eventually die in the squalor of Wybalenna or Oyster Cove.

Panninher "Pennyroyal Creek" clan
The Panninher (parn-in-her) were known to colonial people as the Penny Royal Creek tribe, named eponymously from the river that comes off the Western Tiers south of Drys Bluff (which is now called the Liffey River). The Panninher named the Liffey river tellerpanger and Drys Bluff, the mountain rearing above their homeland, was taytitkekitheker. Their territory broadly covered the north plains of the midlands from the west bank of the Tamar River across to what is now Evandale and terminating at the Tyerrernotepanner country around modern day Conara.

The Panninher also freely moved from the Tamar to the central highlands and brokered trade in ochre from the Toolumbunner mine to neighbouring clans.
Robinson describes the road used by the Panninher from their home up to the Central Highlands, via the gully of the Liffey river, and the South road along the base of the Western Tiers – up the Lake River to modern day Interlaken.

Significant sites
Whilst sites of ritual significance to the Panninher are not known, the Panninher were known to frequent Native Point, on the South Esk River between modern day Perth and Evandale, where flint quarries were located and clans met for celebration. Here local historians believe that cemetery (hollowed) trees were used to inter the dead.
Similarly, Reibey's Ford, near modern-day Hadspen, was a known "resort of the natives" and they named this site moorronnoe. Archaeological evidence shows also indicates signs of continuous occupation at permanent lagoons near Cleveland, which was known historically as a clan meeting place.

The Panninher were affected early by settlement around Norfolk Plains and aggressive assertion of property rights by settlers at first hindered their hunting and migration through their country and, subsequently, led to outright hostility from both parties. Captain Ritchie, an early settler near Perth, tolerated, or fostered, forays by his assigned men against the Panninher and this culminated in a massacre by settlers near modern-day Cressy.
The Panninher, or their neighbouring clansmen, retaliated in various attacks against settlers at Western Lagoon and in remote country up the Lake River, reaching a peak in aggression against the colonial interlopers by 1827.
In 1831 a war party of "100 or 150 stout men" attacked settlers at the base of the Western Tiers and up the Lake River but it is unclear whether this was the action of the Panninher alone or a confederation of warriors from remnant North Tasmanian nations. The colonial settlers made little discrimination between Panninher and members of the "Stony Creek tribe" and it is likely that the North Midlands nation had disintegrated and the amalgamated band was known under the overarching name of "Stony Creek tribe" by this time. This notwithstanding, it seems that the Panninher were resourceful enough to survive in some numbers until late in the Black War.

The Tyerrernotepanner "Stony Creek" clan
The Tyerrernotepanner (Chera-noti-pana) were known to colonial people as the Stony Creek tribe, named eponymously from the small southern tributary of the South Esk at Llewellyn, west of modern-day Avoca.

The clan Tyerrernotepanner were centred at Campbell Town and were one of up to four clans in the south central Midlands area.
Nevertheless, this clan name is now used as a general term for all Aboriginal peoples of this region. The ethnographic and archaeological evidence describes areas of significance to the south central Midlands clans: modern day Lake Leake, Tooms Lake, Windfalls farm, Mt Morriston, Ross township and the lacustrine regions of the midlands all show evidence of tool knapping, middens and records of hut construction consistent with occupation.

Significant sites 
Lake Leake (previously Kearney's Bogs), Campbell Town, Ellinthorpe Plains (near modern day Auburn) and Tooms Lake were described as "resorts of the natives" by settlers and showed substantial evidence of seasonal occupation. Furthermore, several small lagoons in the midlands area all show substantial archeological evidence of regular occupation consistent with tool-making and semi-nomadic use. Aboriginal roads, markenner, are described as passing up the Eastern Tiers to Swanport, up the Western Tier to Interlaken and up the Lake River to Woods Lake and thence to the Central Highlands.

The clan divisions of the southern central Midlands are suggested below. Caution must be exercised as to the provenance of the names and the complete accuracy of attributing discrete geographical regions.
 Tyrrernotepanner: clan at Northern Campbell Town/Lake river/ South Fingal Valley
 Marwemairer: clan at Ross/Mt Morriston region
 Peenrymairmener: clan at Glen Morriston/Lake Leake
 Polemairre: clan at Tunbridge area

The Tyerrernotepanner are described consistently in contemporary records as a "fierce tribe" and the records describe consistent and concerted violence by the Tyerrernotepanner during the Black War. The Tyeerrernotepanner, along with clansmen from other remnant tribes, conducted raids across the midlands during the Black War and, until "conciliated" by Robinson, were the subject of fearful reminiscence by colonial people.
The famed Aboriginal leader Umarrah was a member of this clan and he was noted for his aggression and sustained campaign against European interlopers - although he was raised by colonials himself.

Ben Lomond
The Ben Lomond nation consisted of at least three clans totalling 150–200 people. They occupied the 260 km2 of country surrounding the Ben Lomond plateau. Three clan names are known but their locations are somewhat conjectural – the clans were recorded as Plangermaireener, Plindermairhemener and Tonenerweenerlarmenne.

The Plangermaireener clan is recorded as variously inhabiting the south-east aspect of the Ben Lomond region and also has been associated with the Oyster Bay or Cape Portland clans to the east - indeed the chief Mannalargenna is variously described as a chief of the Oyster Bay, Cape Portland and Ben Lomond nations.
Plangermaireener is also used as a blanket term for the Ben Lomond nation, which reflects the suffix "mairreener"; meaning "people".

The Plindermairhemener are recorded in association with the south and south-western aspects of the region and the location of the Tonenerweenerlarmenne is uncertain, but were probably centred in the remaining Ben Lomond nation territory from White Hills to the headwaters of the North and South-Esk rivers or the upper South-Esk Valley.
This notwithstanding, the Palawa were a nomadic people and likely occupied these lands seasonally.

The Ben Lomond nation is sometimes described as the Ben Lomond/Pennyroyal Creek nation from an entry in Robinson's journal:
'(Mannalargenna) ... said that "the smoke...was that of the Ben Lomond-Pennyroyal Creek natives"'

This is a misnomer, as the Pennyroyal Creek was the original European name for the Liffey River and the Pennyroyal Creek tribe was the contemporary name of the Panninher clan of the North Midlands nation.
Mannalargenna would be familiar with the clans neighbouring his own traditional country and could be relied upon to report accurately the composition of the clanspeople in question. It is plausible that when Robinson was writing in 1830 the remnant peoples of the Ben Lomond nation had federated with that of the Panninher and this was the provenance of the conjoined title.

Seasonal movement
The clans of the Ben Lomond nation were nomadic, and the Aboriginal residents hunted along the valleys of the South Esk and North Esk rivers, their tributaries and the highlands to the northeast; as well as making forays to the plateau in summer. There are records of Aboriginal huts or dwellings around the foothills of Stacks Bluff and around the headwaters of the South Esk River near modern-day Mathinna. On the plateau there is evidence of artifacts around Lake Youl that suggests regular occupation of this site by Aboriginal peoples after the last ice age. The clans of the Ben Lomond nation had close enough relationships with neighbouring clans of the East Coast and North Midlands that they enjoyed seasonal foraging rights to these adjoining territories. John Batman describes the seasonal movement of the Plangermaireener in his diary of May 1830:

"...the tribe travels around Ben Lomond from South Esk to North Esk – and from thence to St. Patricks Head – Georges Bay and round the East Coast"

Batman further describes the relationship between the clans of the Ben Lomond nation and the North East nation:

"...there is (sic) two tribes... they (the 'chiefs' ) are upon friendly terms and often stop and meet and talk 10 days together..."

North West
The North West nation numbered between 400 and 600 people at time of contact with Europeans and had at least eight clans. They had good relations with the North nation, who were allowed access to the resources of the north-west coast. First explored by Europeans in 1824, the region was considered inhospitable and only lightly settled, although it suffered a high rate of Aboriginal dispossession and killings.

South West Coast

South East
Risdon Cove, the first Tasmanian settlement, was located in south-east country. There is eyewitness evidence that the South East nation may have consisted of up to ten clans, totalling around 500 people. However, only four groups totalling 160–200 people were officially recorded as the main source by Robinson, whose journals begin in 1829. By this time, Europeans had settled in most of the South East tribe's country, with the country dispossessed and food resources depleted. Their country contained the most important silcrete, chert and quartzite mines in Tasmania.
The South East people had a hostile relationship with the Oyster Bay people whom they frequently raided, often to kidnap women.
Truganini was a Nuenonne from Bruny Island, which they called Lunawanna-Alonnah. The first two European towns built on the island were named Lunawanna and Alonnah, and most of the island's landmarks are named after Nuenonne people. The island was the source of the sandstone used to build many of Melbourne's buildings, such as the Post Office and Parliament House.

Tasmanian Aboriginal culture

Aboriginal culture was disrupted severely in the 19th century after dispossession of land and incarceration of Aboriginal people on Wybalenna and Oyster Cove. Much traditional knowledge has irrevocably disappeared and what remains has been nurtured over several generations starting with the Aboriginal wives of sealers on the Furneaux Islands.

But, as the Aboriginal writer Greg Lehman states, "Aboriginal culture (is not) past tense." Aboriginal people, in a variety of forms, continue to express their culture in unique ways – expressing themes that lament the past but also celebrate endurance and continuity of culture into the future.

Pre-colonial contact
Contemporary accounts of the ceremonial and cultural life of the Tasmanian Aboriginal people are very limited. There were no observers trained in the social sciences after the French expeditions in the 18th century had made formal study of Tasmanian Aboriginal culture. Moreover, those who wrote most comprehensively of Aboriginal life in the 19th century did so after colonial contact, and the ensuing violence and dislocation, had irrevocably altered traditional Aboriginal culture. Those that most closely observed Aboriginal cultural practices either did not write accounts of what they observed or, if they did, observed culture through the ethnocentric lens of religious and proselytising 19th century European men.

Mythology 
The mythology of the Aboriginal Tasmanians appears to be complex and possibly specific to each clan group. One of their creation myths refers to two creator deities, Moinee and Droemerdene; the children of Parnuen, the sun, and Vena, the moon.

Moinee appears as the primeval creator, forming the land and rivers of Tasmania and fashioning the first man, Parlevar – embodied from a spirit residing in the ground. This form was similar to a kangaroo, and Aboriginal people consequently take the kangaroo as a totem. Similarly, Moinee then created the kangaroo, who emerged, like the first man, from the soil.

Droemerdene appears as the star Canopus who helped the first men to change from their kangaroo-like form. He removed their tails and fashioned their knee joints "so that they could rest" and thus man achieved differentiation form the kangaroo.

Moinee fought with his brother Droemerdene, and many "devils", after Droemerdene changed the shape of the first men and Moinee was finally hurled to his death from the sky to take form as a standing stone at Cox Bight. Droemerdene subsequently fell into the sea at Louisa Bay.
Toogee Low (Port Davey) remained in mythology as a residence of many "devils".

Tasmanian Aboriginal mythology also records in their oral history that the first men emigrated by land from a far-off country and the land was subsequently flooded – an echo of the Tasmanian people's migration from mainland Australia to (then) peninsular Tasmania, and the submergence of the land bridge after the last ice age.

Spirituality 
Little has been recorded of traditional Tasmanian Aboriginal spiritual life. Colonial British recorded that Aboriginal people describe topographical features, such as valleys and caves, as being inhabited by spiritual entities recorded by contemporaries as "sprites". Furthermore, Robinson recorded members of some clans as having animistic regard for certain species of tree within their domain.
Robinson recorded several discussions regarding spiritual entities that his companions describe as having agency or a source of interpretive power to aid their navigation of their physical world. Tasmanian Aboriginal people would describe these entities as "devils" and related that these spiritual beings as walking alongside Aboriginal people "carrying a torch but could not be seen".

Mannarlargenna, in particular, described consulting his "devil" which seems to be a resident personal spirituality that provided prognostic or oracular powers.
The "devil" might also be used to describe malevolent spiritual entities in the Aboriginal cosmos.

Aboriginal people recounted that there was a prime malevolent spirit called rageowrapper, who appeared as a large black (Aboriginal?) man and is associated with the darkness. Rageowrapper might appear borne on a strong wind or be the source of severe illness
this malign spirit might be released from a sick individual by cutting the skin to "let him out".

Several researchers assert that there was belief in a kind of manichaean cosmos with a "good" and "bad" spirit – delineated by day and night – although this may reflect the cultural bias of the observers. Milligan (a contemporary at Wyballenna) described a creator spirit called tiggana marrabona – translating as "twilight man" but as referred to above there are a number of supernatural beings associated with creation.

Etymological study of Milligan's ethnographic data describes a pantheon of spiritual beings associated with environmental or supernatural phenomena:

 nama burag                   – or "the ghost of the thunderstorm"
 ragi roba                        – (see rageowrapper) the "revered spirit" – frequently connoted to awesome/revered/dreaded and a signifier of ghosts/phantoms of the departed when connected with signifier ragi
 laga robana                    – "awful spirit of the dead" i.e. the dead man, some kind of dreaded spirit, malevolent phantom
 maian ginja                     – "the killer" – translates also to fiend/demon: bringer of death
 muran bugana luwana    – "the bright spirit of the night" – a kind of benign or ebullient entity, often described of female form "clothed in grass"
 wara wana                      – "the spirit being" – also warrawah translates to transcendental/ethereal/spirit of dead associated with celestial bodies- may be malevolent
 badenala                        – "shadow man" – ghost or spirit
 kana tana                       – "the bone man" – Western Nation language term for spirit of the dead
 nangina                          – "shadow/ghost" – contemporary association with "fairy" or "elf" – a supernatural entity dwelling "in the hill – dancing (and) fond of children"
 buga nubrana                 – "the man's eye" – associated with the sun – possibly a benign entity

Traditional Aboriginal Tasmanians also related beliefs of a spiritual afterlife. One such belief, related by an Aboriginal person from the west coastal nation, was that the spirit of the dead travelled to a place over the sea: to the far north-west, called Moo-ai. This possibly reflects the ancestral memory of the Mara language group, resident in Western Tasmania, who are believed to have settled Tasmania from the Warrnambool region in modern day Victoria, but other Tasmanians state that after death their spirits would have a post-corporeal existence in their traditional lands. Other references are made to an Island of the Dead, tini drini, described as "an island in Bass Strait" where the dead would be reincarnated or "jump up white men". White here does not refer to European, but rather the skeletal or phantasmic nature of returned dead.

Funeral customs 
The dead might be cremated or interred in a hollow tree or rock grave, dependent on clan custom.
Aboriginal people were also recorded to keep bones of dead people as talismans or amulets. The bones might be worn on a kangaroo sinew string bare around the neck or enclosed in a kangaroo skin bag.

Cosmology 
Traditional Tasmanian Aboriginals saw the night sky as residence of creator spirits (see above) and also describe constellations that represent tribal life; such as figures of fighting men and courting couples.

Material culture

Use of fire 
Tasmanian Aboriginal peoples used bark wrapping to protect fire-starting coals from Tasmania's wet maritime climate. When their last coal was extinguished, they would ask fire from neighbouring hearths or clans, but also probably used friction fire-starting methods and possibly mineral percussion, despite claims that the native Tasmanians had "lost" the ability to make fire. Tasmanian Aboriginal people extensively employed fire for cooking, warmth, tool hardening and clearing vegetation to encourage and control macropod herds. This management may have caused the buttongrass plains in southwest Tasmania to develop to their current extent.

Hunting and diet 
Approximately 4,000 years ago, Aboriginal Tasmanians largely dropped scaled fish from their diet, and began eating more land mammals, such as possums, kangaroos, and wallabies. Aboriginal Tasmanians had employed bone tools, but it appears that they switched from worked bone tools to more efficient sharpened stone tools. The significance of the disappearance of bone tools (believed to have been primarily used for fishing) and fish in the diet is heavily debated. Some argue that it is evidence of a maladaptive society, while others argue that the change was economical, as large areas of scrub at that time were changing to grassland, providing substantially increased food resources. Fish were never a large part of the diet, ranking behind shellfish and seals, and with more resources available, the cost/benefit ratio of fishing may have become too high.
Archaeological evidence indicates that around the time these changes took place, the Tasmanian people began expanding their territories, a process that was still continuing when Europeans arrived.

Basket making 
Basket making is a traditional craft which has been developed into contemporary art. Baskets had many uses, including carrying food, tools, shells, ochre, and eating utensils. Basket-like carriers were made from plant materials, kelp, or animal skin. The kelp baskets or carriers were used mainly to carry and serve water.

Plants were carefully selected to produce strong, thin, narrow strips of fibre of suitable length for basket making. Several different species of plant were used, including white flag iris, blue flax lily, rush and sag, some of which are still used by contemporary basket makers, and sometimes shells are added for ornament.

Tasmanian Aboriginal shell necklace art
Making necklaces from shells is a significant cultural tradition among Tasmanian Aboriginal women.
Necklaces were used for adornment, as gifts and tokens of honour, and as trading objects. Dating back at least 2,600 years, necklace-making is one of the few Palawa traditions that has remained intact and has continued without interruption since before European settlement. A number of shell necklaces are held in the collection of the National Museum of Australia.

The necklaces were initially only made out of the shells of the Phasianotrochus irisodontes snail, commonly known as the rainbow kelp and usually referred to as maireener shells. There are three other species of maireeners found in Tasmanian waters. In the past 20 years, there has been a decline in the number of shells, since the decline in kelp and seaweed growth around Flinders Island, Cape Barren and Big Dog islands due to climate change, which has led to erosion of the sea bed.

Ochre 
Ochre is highly significant in Tasmanian Aboriginal culture. Tasmanian ochre ranges in colour from white through yellow to red. Its uses include ceremonial body marking, colouring wood craft products, tie-dyeing, and other crafts and arts.

Traditionally, Aboriginal women had the exclusive role of obtaining ochre, and many Tasmanian Aboriginal men continue to respect this custom by obtaining ochre only from women. Though ochre is mined from sites throughout Tasmania, the most celebrated source is Toolumbunner in the Gog Range of NW Tasmania, in the traditional lands of the Pallitorre clan. This was also a significant site of tribal meeting, celebration and trading.

Ceremony 
Colonial settlers describe various traditional ceremonies of Aboriginal people. One has been called "corobery", although that is a mainland Aboriginal word adopted by British settlers. Ceremonial dance and singing depicted traditional tales as well as recent events.
Robinson describes "horse-dance" depicting a horseman hunting an Aboriginal person, as well as the sensual "devil-dance" performed by women from the Furneaux islands.

Battles and funerals were also occasions for painting the body with ochre or black paint. At the funeral of an Aboriginal man named "Robert" in Launceston, an Aboriginal mourner was asked the meaning of his body paint, and replied "what do you wear fine clothes for?"

Visual art 
Contemporary colonial settlers relate several examples of pictorial art drawn on the insides of huts or on remnants of discarded paper. These designs are generally circular or spiral motifs that represent celestial bodies or figures of clans-people. Robinson related that one design in an Aboriginal hut was very accurately drawn and was created via the use of a kind of wooden compass.

The most enduring art form left by Tasmanians are petroglyphs, or rock art. The most elaborate site is at Preminghana on the West Coast, although other significant sites exist at the Bluff in Devonport and at Greenes Creek. Smaller sites include the cupules at meenamatta Blue Tier and isolated circle motifs at Trial Harbour.

Aboriginal people inhabited Tasmania's South-west from the last glacial maximum and hand stencils and ochre smears are found in several caves, the oldest of which is dated to 10000 years ago.

Modern Tasmanian Aboriginal culture

Visual art 
Tasmanian Aboriginal people are asserting their identity and culture through the visual arts. The art expresses the Aboriginal viewpoint on colonial history, race relations and identity. Themes consistent in modern Tasmanian Aboriginal art are loss, kinship, narratives of dispossession but also survival. The art is modern, using textiles, sculpture and photography but often incorporates ancient motifs and techniques such as shell necklaces and practical artifacts.

Photographer Ricky Maynard has had his work exhibited internationally and his documentary style "brings to light the stories of Aboriginal people where they have previously been absent or distorted. His photographs mark historical sites, events and figures of great significance to Tasmanian and mainland Aboriginal people, and speak to their struggle in a subtle, poetic, and powerful way."

Modern painting in Tasmania is starting to use techniques shared by Aboriginal art in mainland Australia but incorporating traditional Tasmanian motifs, such as spirals and celestial representation.
This shows that, like mainland Australia, Aboriginal art is dynamic and evolving from established post-colonial preconceptions.

Tasmanian Aboriginal women have traditionally collected Maireener shells to fashion necklaces and bracelets.
This practice continues by Aboriginal women whose families survived on the Furneaux Islands, handed down by elder women to maintain an important link with traditional lifestyle.
Late in the nineteenth century a number of women aimed to keep this part of their traditional culture alive in order to allow their daughters and granddaughters to participate in their cultural heritage. Today, there are only a few Tasmanian Aboriginal women who maintain this art, but they continue to hand down their knowledge and skills to younger women in their community. Shell necklace manufacture continues to maintain links with the past but is expressed as a modern art form.

Writing 
The earliest publication attributed to Tasmanian authors, predating the journalism of David Unaipon by a century, was The Aboriginal/Flinders Island Chronicle, written between September 1836 and December 1837, though it is unclear to what degree its composition was influenced by "The Commandant", George Robinson.

Tasmanian Aboriginal authors in the past century have written history, poetry, essays and fiction. Authors such as Ida West have written autobiographies recounting their experiences growing up within white society; Phyllis Pitchford, Errol West and Jim Everett have written poetry, while Everett and Greg Lehman have explored their tradition as essayists.

Legislated definition
In June 2005, the Tasmanian Legislative Council introduced a reformed definition of Aboriginality into the Aboriginal Lands Act.
The bill was passed to allow Aboriginal Lands Council elections to commence, resolving the uncertainty over who was "Aboriginal", and thus eligible to vote.

Under the bill, a person can claim "Tasmanian Aboriginality" if they meet all of the following criteria:
 Ancestry
 Self-identification
 Community recognition

Government compensation for "Stolen Generations"
On 13 August 1997 a Statement of Apology (specific to removal of children) was unanimously supported by the Tasmanian Parliament:

There are many people currently working in the community, academia, various levels of government and NGOs to strengthen Tasmanian Aboriginal culture and improve the conditions of the descendant community.

In November 2006 Tasmania became the first Australian state or territory to offer financial compensation for the Stolen Generations, Aboriginal people forcibly removed from their families by Australian government agencies and church missions between about 1900 and 1972. Up to 40 Aboriginal Tasmanians' descendants are expected to be eligible for compensation from the $5 million package.

Notable Aboriginal Tasmanians
 Tunnerminnerwait
 Trugernanner (Truganini) and Fanny Cochrane Smith, who both claimed to be the last "full blooded" Palawa.
 William Lanne or "King Billy"
 Michael Mansell, lawyer and activist
 Mannalargenna
 Arra-Maida

Literature and entertainment
 The play The Golden Age by Louis Nowra
 The novel English Passengers by Matthew Kneale
 Historical novel Doctor Wooreddy's Prescription for Enduring the Ending of the World by Mudrooroo
 The poem Oyster Cove by Gwen Harwood
 The AFI Award-winning 1980 film Manganinnie, based on Beth Roberts's novel.
 The Novel The Roving party by Rohan Wilson – fictional account of Manarlagenna and William "Black Bill" Ponsonby during the Black War.
 The AACTA Award-winning film The Nightingale, written, directed, and co-produced by Jennifer Kent.
 The play At What Cost by Nathan Maynard at Belvoir (theatre company)

See also 

 First Australians, TV documentary series, featuring Aboriginal Tasmanians in Episode 2
 Woretemoeteryenner (1795–1847), one of the few Palawa people to bridge the times before and after European contact

Further reading

Notes

References

Citations

Sources

External links

 Records Relating to Tasmanian Aboriginal People from the Archives Office of Tasmania "Brief Guide No. 18". Retrieved from Internet Archive 13 December 2013.
 Statistics – Tasmania – occupation (from the Australian Bureau of Statistics)
 The Lia Pootah People Home Page
 Reconciliation Australia
 1984 Review of Tom Haydon's documentary "The Last Tasmanian" (1978)
 A history from the Australian Human Rights and Equal Opportunity Commission.
 National Museum of Australia
 List of multiple killings of Aborigines in Tasmania: 1804–1835 by Lyndall Ryan, 5 March 2008

 
Australian Aboriginal culture